Jeong Bo-kyeong (born 17 April 1991) is a South Korean judoka. She ranks as Nr. 8. in the world.

Career

She won a bronze medal at the 2015 World Judo Championships – Women's 48 kg. She won the silver medal at the 2016 Summer Olympics in the women's 48 kg event.

References

External links
 
 
 
 

1991 births
Living people
People from Jinju
South Korean female judoka
Judoka at the 2016 Summer Olympics
Olympic judoka of South Korea
Olympic silver medalists for South Korea
Olympic medalists in judo
Medalists at the 2016 Summer Olympics
Judoka at the 2014 Asian Games
Judoka at the 2018 Asian Games
Asian Games gold medalists for South Korea
Asian Games silver medalists for South Korea
Asian Games bronze medalists for South Korea
Asian Games medalists in judo
Medalists at the 2014 Asian Games
Medalists at the 2018 Asian Games
Universiade medalists in judo
Universiade gold medalists for South Korea
Universiade silver medalists for South Korea
Medalists at the 2015 Summer Universiade
Medalists at the 2017 Summer Universiade
20th-century South Korean women
21st-century South Korean women